Antonio Nariño is the 15th locality of Bogotá, capital of Colombia. It is located in the central part of the city. This district is mostly inhabited by middle class residents. The locality is named after an early Colombian leader, Antonio Nariño, who is often referred to as the precursor to the presidency.

General information

Borders 
 North: Autopista Sur, Calle 8 Sur and Avenida Primera, with the localities of Puente Aranda and Los Mártires
 South: Avenida Primero de Mayo, with the locality of Rafael Uribe Uribe
 East: Carrera 10ª, with the locality of San Cristóbal
 West: Calle 44 Sur, with the locality of Tunjuelito

Hydrology 
The locality had several rivers that have been transformed into canals flowing into the Fucha River. It has several parks. There is one major commercial sector in the Restrepo neighborhood, with the balance of the locality consisting of residential areas with small stores and churches.

Topography 
The topography of the locality is mainly flat, as it is located on the Bogotá savanna.

Transportation 
The mass transport system of Bogotá, TransMilenio, runs on Avenida Caracas (Restrepo and Fucha stations) and Autopista Sur. Other buses serve Avenida Primera, Primero de Mayo, and Carrera 10.

History 
During the 19th century, the territory belonged to the rule of Muequetá, as part of the Muisca Confederation. Large estates, located on the shores of the rivers that crossed it, were built by the Spanish after the conquest. The process of urbanization started in 1920, and was completed over the following 50 years. It was separated as a locality in 1991. The majority of the locality contains estrato 3 residential areas.

Economy 
The Restrepo area is located on Carrera 24 until the Avenida Primero de Mayo, which is the largest commercial area of the locality. A large number of small companies are located here, with the production of low-cost, high-quality shoes among the most notable of industries.

Neighborhoods 
Main neighborhoods are Restrepo, Policarpa Salavarrieta, Luna Park, Villa Mayor, Eduardo Freí, San Antonio, Caracas, Ciudad Berna, Ciudad Jardín, La Fragua, Eduardo Santos, and Santander.

References

External links 
  Official site of the locality
  National University of Colombia site about Antonio Nariño

Localities of Bogotá